Oxytelus varipennis is a species of rove beetle widely spread in Asia and Europe. It is found in China, Hong Kong, South Korea, Japan, Myanmar, Indonesia, Pakistan, India, Sri Lanka, Nepal, Bangladesh, and Egypt.

Description
Male is about 4.6 mm and female is 3.7 mm in length. Body is dark brown to pitchy. Head and pronotum are darker brown. Elytra testaceous and legs are brownish. In male, head is sub-pentagonal. Clypeus sub-quadrangular. Mandibles are stout and lightly curved. Epistomal suture with broadly incurved lateral portions. Eyes are with coarse facets. Mandible is slender and slightly curved. Pronotum transverse. Elytra punctate and strigose. Abdomen coriaceous and pubescent. Female is similar to male but slightly smaller with much slender and pointy apex in mandible. Spermatheca C-shaped.

The Egyptian population is assigned as a subspecies: O. v. pharaonum.

References 

Staphylinidae
Insects of Sri Lanka
Insects of India
Beetles described in 1859